Mount Cramer, at  is the second highest peak in the Sawtooth Range of Idaho. The summit of Mount Cramer is located on the border of Custer and Boise Counties. The peak is the highest point in Boise County. Mount Cramer is also located within the Sawtooth Wilderness portion of the Sawtooth National Recreation Area. The west side of Mount Cramer drains into the South Fork of the Payette River, while the east side drains to the Salmon River.

Mount Cramer can be climbed in one day via the Hell Roaring Lake Trailhead, which is located  down unmaintained Sawtooth National Forest road 398, west of Idaho Route 75.  The last section of the  hike and class 3 scramble is off-trail.

See also

 List of peaks of the Sawtooth Range (Idaho)
 List of mountains of Idaho
 List of mountain peaks of Idaho
 List of mountain ranges in Idaho

References

External links 
 Peak Bagger—Thompson Peak
 SummitPost.org—Thompson Peak
 Idaho Summits—Mount Cramer
 Sawtooth National Forest—Official Site

Mountains of Boise County, Idaho
Mountains of Custer County, Idaho
Mountains of Idaho
Sawtooth Wilderness